The 2023 12 Hours of Sebring (formally known as the 71st Mobil 1 Twelve Hours of Sebring Presented by Advance Auto Parts) was an endurance sports car race  held at Sebring International Raceway near Sebring, Florida from 15 to 18 March 2023. It was the second round of both the 2023 IMSA SportsCar Championship and the Michelin Endurance Cup. Cadillac Racing entered as the defending overall winners of the 12-hour event, albeit in the new-for-2023 GTP class rather than DPi.

The race was won by the #31 Whelen Engineering Racing entry, driven by Pipo Derani, Jack Aitken, and Alexander Sims, after a late accident eliminated the top three GTP-class cars.

Background
2023 saw the introduction of LMDh machinery into the IMSA SportsCar Championship and FIA World Endurance Championship, allowing teams in the top classes to compete in both marquee series on the same weekend. The Acura ARX-06 of Meyer Shank Racing with Curb-Agajanian claimed victory in the first race in class history, the 2023 24 Hours of Daytona, and the car continued its early success by topping IMSA's sanctioned test that took place at Sebring approximately a month before the 12-hour event, albeit this time in the hands of Wayne Taylor Racing. Former racing driver and Sebring Hall of Fame inductee Lyn St. James served as the race's grand marshal. 

The "Super Sebring" weekend also presented the opportunity for a number of drivers in other classes to compete in both endurance events in the same weekend. The Iron Dames trio of Michelle Gatting, Rahel Frey, and Sarah Bovy, for instance, competed in both the GTE Am category of the 1000 Miles of Sebring as well as the GTD class in the 12-hour. A total of 27 drivers pulled double duty across the two races, with only Dane Cameron and Michael Christensen running in the top class for both. 

On March 8, 2023, IMSA released the latest technical bulletin outlining Balance of Performance for the GTP and LMP2 classes. Wholesale changes were introduced to the top class following the 24 Hours of Daytona, where all cars ran on equal metrics. All cars ran on a 1030 kilogram base weight at Daytona, whereas at Sebring the Cadillac ran at the lowest weight (1038 kg), with the BMW at 1040 kg, the Porsche at 1048 kg, and the Acura at 1054 kg. As a result, the Cadillac and BMW both ran at 513 kilowatts of power, while the Porsche ran with 517 kW and the Acura with 520 kW – up from 500 kW across the board at Daytona. Maximum stint energy figures were also adjusted. No performance changes were announced for the LMP2 class. On March 9, IMSA released the balance of performance metrics for the GTD class. The Porsche received a five millimeter increase to its air restrictor after suffering from a lack of straight-line speed at Daytona. This change marked a four millimeter increase from the Sebring test, after which several Porsche teams threatened to withdraw their entries from the series if BoP concerns were not addressed. The new-for-2023 Lamborghini also received an air restrictor size increase from 47 to 49 millimeters after suffering from a similar lack of pace in the opening round. The Ferrari received an increase in turbo boost pressure as well as a 15 kg weight increase, while the Acura also received similar changes in boost pressure but instead lost 15 kg. Other cars that received a weight break included the Aston Martin, BMW, Corvette, and Lexus, while the Mercedes received an equivalent increase. 

Aside from the WEC support race, the Michelin Pilot Challenge and Porsche Carrera Cup North America made up the support bill. The former race was won by Robby Foley and Vin Barletta of Turner Motorsport, while Riley Dickinson swept the pair of Carrera Cup events.

Entries

A total of 53 cars took part in the event, split across five classes. 8 were entered in GTP, 8 in LMP2, 9 in LMP3, 8 in GTD Pro, and 20 in GTD.

In GTP, the field was reduced by one entry following the season-opening round. Cadillac Racing's second car, in accordance with the team's plan for the entry to conduct the 2023 FIA World Endurance Championship season, was removed. Wayne Taylor Racing, BMW M Team RLL, and Meyer Shank Racing also removed the fourth driver from their entries, being Brendon Hartley, Colton Herta, and Simon Pagenaud respectively. In LMP2, entries from Proton Competition and AF Corse did not return following Daytona, reducing the entry to eight cars. Nolan Siegel was also added to CrowdStrike Racing's entry.

In LMP3, Ave Motorsports made their season debut, competing with Seth Lucas, Trenton Estep, and Tõnis Kasemets. Jr III Racing, also making their season debut at Sebring, added Dakota Dickerson to their driver lineup of Ari Balogh and Garett Grist just weeks before the event, ensuring that the class runners-up from 2022 returned. Dickerson's place in the Andretti Autosport lineup was filled by Dutch driver Glenn van Berlo. Dan Goldburg joined the JDC-Miller MotorSports lineup, while Robert Mau was an addition to the Performance Tech Motorsports entry. Performance Tech finalized their entry with the addition of Tristan Nunez. FastMD Racing also did not continue their entry past Daytona. Late in the weekend, MRS-GT Racing removed their entry.

In GTD Pro, Risi Competizione added Stock Car Pro Series driver Gabriel Casagrande to their lineup, with the Brazilian making his first IMSA start since 2014, where he drove in the PC class for Performance Tech. Both Team TGM and MDK Motorsports also did not continue to field an entry at Sebring, with MDK scaling back their planned Endurance Cup campaign due to BoP concerns. Kyle Kirkwood and Franck Perera were added to the Vasser Sullivan Racing and Iron Lynx lineups, respectively. After initially committing to the Michelin Endurance Cup, SunEnergy1 Racing were also absent from the Sebring entry list, as were NTE Sport and the Iron Lynx #19. NTE Sport cited financial difficulties following their Daytona crash as the primary reason for their absence. Julien Andlauer was also added to the #92 Kelly-Moss lineup. Inception Racing, which competed with the McLaren 720S GT3 base model at Daytona, upgraded to the Evo specification for Sebring, giving the package its global race debut.

Practice

Practice 1
The first practice session took place at 10:10 AM ET on Thursday and ended with Filipe Albuquerque topping the charts for Wayne Taylor Racing with Andretti Autosport, with a lap time of 1:48.303.

Practice 2
The second practice session took place at 3:50 PM ET on Thursday and ended with Tom Blomqvist topping the charts for Meyer Shank Racing with Curb-Agajanian, with a lap time of 1:47.049.

Night Practice
The night practice session took place at 7:45 PM ET on Thursday and ended with Alexander Sims topping the charts for Whelen Engineering Racing, with a lap time of 1:48.820.

Final Practice
The fourth and final practice session took place at 8:55 AM ET on Friday and ended with Mathieu Jaminet topping the charts for Porsche Penske Motorsport, with a lap time of 1:47.086.

Warm-Up
The morning warm-up took place at 8:00 AM ET on Saturday and ended with Mathieu Jaminet again topping the charts for Porsche Penske Motorsport, with a lap time of 1:48.398.

Qualifying

Qualifying results

Race

Results

References

External links

12 Hours of Sebring
12 Hours of Sebring
12 Hours of Sebring
12 Hours of Sebring